Johnstown Township may refer to:

 Johnstown Township, Michigan
 Johnstown Township, Grand Forks County, North Dakota, in Grand Forks County, North Dakota

Township name disambiguation pages